Hassan Township was an urban township in Hennepin County, Minnesota, United States.  Located in the northwestern corner of the county, it was the last remaining township in the county.  The population was 2,600 at the 2010 census.

The town began incorporation proceedings in 2003 but abandoned its petition and chose to sign a Joint Powers agreement with the nearby city of Rogers to annex the entirety of Hassan Township. The Hassan Town Board approved annexation in June 2008 with orderly annexation to begin in 2012.

The origin of the name comes from the Dakota word chanhasen meaning the "sugar-maple tree" (chan, tree; haza, a tree with sap). Since the then-township of Chanhassen had established two years before Hassan, the chan syllable was dropped to avoid confusion.

Geography
The township completely encircled the city of Rogers. County Roads 81, 116, and 144 were three of the main routes in the township.

Demographics

As of the census of 2000, there were 2,463 people, 778 households, and 689 families residing in the township. The racial makeup of the township was 98.38% White, 0.32% African American, 0.32% Asian, 0.16% from other races, and 0.81% from two or more races. Hispanic or Latino of any race were 0.41% of the population.

There were 778 households, out of which 48.8% had children under the age of 18 living with them, 81.4% were married couples living together, 4.1% had a female householder with no husband present, and 11.4% were non-families. 8.1% of all households were made up of individuals, and 2.2% had someone living alone who was 65 years of age or older.  The average household size was 3.17 and the average family size was 3.36.

In the township the population was spread out, with 32.9% under the age of 18, 5.7% from 18 to 24, 32.5% from 25 to 44, 24.5% from 45 to 64, and 4.4% who were 65 years of age or older.  The median age was 36 years. For every 100 females, there were 102.5 males.  For every 100 females age 18 and over, there were 103.6 males.

The median income for a household in the township was $79,158, and the median income for a family was $81,832. Males had a median income of $46,689 versus $35,313 for females. The per capita income for the township was $27,350.  None of the families and 0.3% of the population were living below the poverty line, including no under eighteens and none of those over 64.

History
At the time of it annexation into Rogers, Hassan was the sole remaining township in Hennepin County.  The Town of Hassan was classified as an Urban Township which provided for the exercising of more powers than non-urban townships.

The City of Rogers lay entirely within the original township. Hassan's rolling landscape was composed of farmsteads, cultivated fields, scattered homes and subdivisions separated by wetlands, woodlands, and drainageways.

Settlement in 1854 by European immigrants brought about major changes in the landscape of what is now Hassan Township.  Originally, as part of the "Big Woods", the areas was heavily timbered with oak, elm, basswood, ash, and maple.  Large areas of marshland also existed.  As settlers arrived, the woods were cleared and the land was tilled for farmstead construction and crop production.

Early on, small trade centers, known as hamlets, emerged in Hassan Township to serve the needs of the settlers.  The hamlet of Hassan was first settled in 1854 and then organized in 1860 along Territorial Road in Section 21.  Between 1854 and 1881, Hassan contained a clustering of houses, a post office, St. John's Episcopal Church, a school and a town hall.  Today, an altered school, a church and town hall remain.  Today, a few businesses still thrive in Hassan, including Hassan Sand and Gravel, Minuteman Services, and Town and Country Landscaping, among others.

Although not the earliest settlement, Fletcher, originally named St. Walburga by German immigrants, has become the most notable. It stands at the intersection of Territorial Road and County Road 116 (Fletcher Lane) in Hassan Township.  Fletcher is considered to be the "finest example of a traditional crossroads hamlet in Hennepin County" and is eligible to become a historic district by the Minnesota Historical Society.

Territorial Road crosses over a series of ridges, including a section that includes the highest point in Hennepin County.  It was authorized by the Territorial Legislature in 1855 and identified as the "first legitimate outlet" for this section of Hennepin County.  Through the years, it became a major transportation route for Hassan Township and surrounding communities "because it was maintained and it provided relatively easy access to Minneapolis markets." (Hennepin History Museum; 1995).

References

Townships in Hennepin County, Minnesota
Populated places established in 1854
Populated places disestablished in 2012
Dakota toponyms
Defunct townships in Minnesota
1854 establishments in Minnesota Territory